Staten Island (also known as Little New York) is a 2009 crime film written and directed by James DeMonaco in his directorial debut. It stars Ethan Hawke, Vincent D'Onofrio, and Seymour Cassel as three Staten Islanders whose lives intersect through a crime. Following a very limited theatrical run in New York City, it was released on DVD and Blu-ray Disc in December 2009.

Synopsis
A Staten Island mob boss Parmie (D'Onofrio) is robbed by a septic tank cleaner named Sully (Hawke), who is friends with Jasper (Cassel), a deaf deli employee moonlighting as a corpse chopper for Parmie.

Cast
Ethan Hawke as Sully Halverson
Vincent D'Onofrio as Parmie Tarzo
Seymour Cassel as Jasper Sabiano
Julianne Nicholson as Mary Halverson
Adrian Martinez as Officer Rodriguez

Critical reception
On Rotten Tomatoes the film has an approval rating of 25% based on reviews from 8 critics. The New York Times critic praised the director James DeMonaco for "adroitly weaving violence, absurdity and sentiment, even an environmental consciousness, into a modest, appealing fable", while the reviewer from The New York Daily News blamed him for "wasting a strong cast in silly roles".

References

External links

English-language French films
2009 crime drama films
Films directed by James DeMonaco
Films produced by Luc Besson
Films set in Staten Island
Films with screenplays by James DeMonaco
2009 directorial debut films
2009 films
2000s English-language films